The Gaula is a river located in the Sunnfjord region of Vestland county, Norway. The river is a good salmon fishing river. The river runs across the whole municipality of Gaular, and the river is the namesake of the municipality.

Course
The river begins as glacial runoff in the Gaularfjellet mountains and it runs through the municipalities of Sunnfjord and Sogndal. The glaciers that feed the river are Grovabreen, Jostefonn, and Troget, all three are located just west of the massive Jostedalsbreen glacier. This is one reason why the area is often referred to as Fosselandet (lit. "the land of waterfalls"). There are many waterfalls on the Gaular and its tributaries.

The river Gaula begins as two main branches.  The northern branch begins in the mountains east of the village of Haukedalen in Førde Municipality.  That branch flows to the southwest eventually into the lake Viksdalsvatnet.  The southern branch begins at the lake Norddalsvatnet on the border of the municipalities of Sunnfjord and Sogndal.  It flows along the border, then south into Sogndal to the lake Nystølsvatnet. The river then turns west, back into Sunnfjord municipality and it heads west until it empties into the lake Viksdalsvatnet.  This lake is where the two branches join together.  It then finishes its course by flowing westward, passing through the municipal center of Sande, before emptying into the Dalsfjorden at Osen near the village of Bygstad.  The European route E39 highway crosses the river just east of the village of Sande.

Media gallery

See also
List of rivers in Norway

References

Rivers of Vestland
Sunnfjord
Sogndal
Rivers of Norway